Sevastopol zoo is the youngest of Crimean zoos. It is also the first zoo ever opened in Sevastopol.

History
The zoo was founded in 2012 by Remigius Vradiy Viktoro, enthusiast in selection and breeding of animals, incumbent director of the zoo. The zoo collection is constantly growing, replenished by exchange with other zoos and purchase of animals from the kennels.

Location
Currently, the zoo is located nearby "Kolya Pishchenko Street" station of the bus routes 109 and 20, just a few stops away from the Black Sea branch of the MSU, the "Sevastopol" stadium, "Lukomorie" ecological park and the memorial complex "Malakhov Kurgan".

Pictures

See also
List of zoos
Kyiv Zoo
Odessa Zoo

References

External links
Zoo official webpage

Zoos in Ukraine
Buildings and structures in Sevastopol
Tourist attractions in Sevastopol
Zoos established in 2012
2012 establishments in Ukraine
Zoos in Crimea